The women's 50 metre freestyle S8 event at the 2016 Paralympic Games took place on 16 September 2016, at the Olympic Aquatics Stadium. Two heats were held, with seven and eight swimmers respectively. The swimmers with the eight fastest times advanced to the final, which was won by Australia's Maddison Elliott.

Records
Prior to the competition, the existing World and Paralympic records were as follows:

Source:

Heats

Heat 1
10:09 16 September 2016

Heat 2
10:12 16 September 2016

Final
18:03 11 September 2016

References

Swimming at the 2016 Summer Paralympics